Tankara is a town in Morbi district in the Indian state of Gujarat. It is situated on the Demi River and on Rajkot-Morbi Highway, 20 kilometres from Morbi, 40 kilometres from Rajkot, and 80 kilometres from Jamnagar. Tankara is considered a holy city to Arya Samajis because it is the birthplace of Swami Dayananda Saraswati, founder of the Arya Samaj, who was born on 12 February 1824.

Rishi Bodh Utsav 

Every year on Maha Shivaratri, the Arya Samajis commemorate Swami Dayananda Sarasvati's Rishi Bodh Utsav during the 2 days mela at Tankara organised by Tankara Trust, during which Shobha Yatra procession and Maha Yajna is held, event is also attended by the Prime Minister of India Narendra Modi and Chief Minister of Gujarat Vijay Rupani.

Industry 
Tankara is famous for quality cotton bales production and has 25 to 30 cotton ginning factories and many cotton oil mills. Tankara is the fourth largest business centre in the field of cotton oil mill and ginning industries in Saurashtra and fifth in Gujarat. This industry is the fastest growing in this region. Tankara is also one of the major centres of silver imitation jewellery manufacturing. Tankara has been facing many basic infrastructure related problem such as: and with polypack industries production are pp woven fabric, pp non woven fabric and more manufacturer.

Hospitals 
In Tankara Health services are primarily provided at government hospital and many private hospitals.

List of villages in Tankara 
 Amrapar (tol)

 Bangavadi
 Bedi
 Bhutkotda
 Chhattar
 Devaliya
 Dhroliya
 Ganeshpar
 Ghunada
 Khanpar
 Hadala
 Hadmatiya
 Hamirpar
 Harbatiyali
 Haripar
 Hirapar
 Jabalpur
Jainagar
 Jivapartankara
 Jodhpar (zala)
 Kagdadi
 Kalyanpar
 Khakhra
 Kothariya
 Lajai
 Lakhdhir Gadh
 Meghpar Zala
 Mitana
 Mota Khijadiya
 Nana Khijadiya
 Nana Rampar*ramnagar*(part of rampar)
 Nasitpar
 Neknam
 Nesda
 Khanpar
 Nesda
 Surji
 Otala
 Rajavad
 Rohishala
 Sajanpar
 Sakhpar
 Saraya
 Savdi
 Tankara
 Tol
 Umiyanagar
 Vachhakpar
 Vaghgadh
 Vijaynagar
 Virpar
 Virvav

References 

Cities and towns in Morbi district
Hindu pilgrimage sites
Arya Samaj